Van Steeden is a surname. Notable people with the surname include:

Peter van Steeden (1904–1990), American composer
Riki van Steeden (born 1976), New Zealand soccer player

Surnames of Dutch origin